Nikita Davydov (born 9 April 1988) is a Russian professional ice hockey goaltender currently playing for Atlant Moscow Oblast of the Kontinental Hockey League.

External links

1988 births
Living people
Atlant Moscow Oblast players
Russian ice hockey goaltenders
Salavat Yulaev Ufa players
Sportspeople from Ufa